Harry William Verelst (2 July 1846 – 5 April 1918) was an English amateur first-class cricketer, who played three games for Yorkshire County Cricket Club in 1868 and 1869.  He also appeared in first-class games for the Marylebone Cricket Club (MCC) (1868), Gentlemen of the North (1867), North of the Thames (1868), Gentlemen of England (1870) and I Zingari (1878).

He was the eldest son Charles Verelst and his wife Anne Jane Willacy, born in Claughton, Birkenhead, Cheshire, England, Verelst was a right-handed batsman, who scored 215 runs at 15.35, with a best of 78 for Gentlemen of the North against Gentlemen of the South.  He scored three fifties and took two catches.

Verelst died in April 1918 at Aston Hall, Yorkshire.

References

External links
Cricinfo Profile
Cricket Archive Statistics

1846 births
1918 deaths
Sportspeople from Birkenhead
Yorkshire cricketers
I Zingari cricketers
Gentlemen of the North cricketers
English cricketers
North of the Thames v South of the Thames cricketers
Marylebone Cricket Club cricketers
Gentlemen of England cricketers